

Television

2020s

2010s

2000s

For the first two games of the 2008–09 season, in Prague, WEPN carried a simulcast of MSG audio with Sam Rosen and Joe Micheletti in Prague, and Don La Greca and Pete Stemkowski in the New York studio for intermissions.

1990s

1980s

1970s

HBO's first sports broadcast was of a New York Rangers-Vancouver Canucks NHL game, transmitted to a Service Electric cable system in Wilkes-Barre, Pennsylvania on November 8, 1972. From 1972 to 1974, HBO used only one announcer on Rangers games so Marty Glickman, who was in charge of HBO Sports, hired other announcers to replace him when he was unavailable, generally owing to his radio commitments to Giants football.

1960s

Win Eliot called the Rangers games on WPIX-11 as part of The Saturday Night Sports Special. In the early 1960s, the Rangers played Saturday afternoon games, which were tape delayed for evening re-broadcast on Channel 11. The Saturday night hockey games were almost always shown at 9 p.m. Road games were usually aired live if the Rangers were at Chicago, where the game was at 8:30 p.m., and after expansion, in St. Louis or Minnesota, where 9 p.m. would be the actual start time. In the 1964–65 season, Win Elliott did all the Saturday night games until March 20, which was the first Saturday of the racing season at Aqueduct, where Elliott hosted a Saturday afternoon series. Jim Gordon therefore, did the last two Saturday nights of the season. When the Rangers weren't scheduled on Saturday nights, Channel 11 would run events such as track and field and ECAC Basketball. This occurred from 1962 to 1965, before the Knicks and Rangers moved to Channel 9. They even showed a different NHL game on occasion, which was the case on March 27, 1965, when Jim Gordon went to Toronto to do a Detroit-Toronto game for WPIX.

1950s

1940s

The Rangers' home game against the Montreal Canadiens on February 25, 1940, was the first National Hockey League game to ever be broadcast on television.

Radio

2020s

2010s

2000s

1990s

1980s

1970s

Notes 
For many years when he was the radio voice of the Rangers, Marv Albert missed more games than he called. Marv had multiple commitments that forced him to miss games. The alternate radio play-by-play announcers from 1985–1987 actually did more games than Marv Albert. In his 19-year career as the color commentator, Sal Messina worked with 18 different play-by-play partners, even though nominally his only partners were Marv or Kenny Albert. Messina also did play-by-play on several games. Sal Messina also sometimes did TV, filling in for Bill Chadwick, Phil Esposito, and later John Davidson. So there were some additional radio analysts at times. Pete Stemkowski, Dave Maloney, Ron Greschner, Pierre Larouche, Emile Francis, Chris Nilan, and Ulf Nilsson filled in for Messina. During the years when only the non-televised road games were broadcast, at times the TV crew, Sal Marchiano/Bill Chadwick (in 1972–73), Jim Gordon/Chadwick, and Gordon/Phil Esposito later did the games on radio, especially on lengthy road trips.

1960s

1950s

1940s

1930s

1920s

It was not until the 1987–88 season that all Rangers' games was broadcast locally on radio in New York; for many years prior to that, only home games and (after the late 1940s) a handful of away games were heard. Regular-season away games heard on radio after the early 1960s were generally not broadcast locally on television.

Alternate announcers

Television

Play-by-play
Bruce Beck: 1982–1984
Mike Crispino: 2005–2007
John Giannone: 2005–Present
Bob Wischusen: 2006–2007

Color commentator
Sal Messina: 1972–2004
Dave Maloney: 2005–2007

Studio host
John Giannone: 2005–Present
Bill Pidto: 2009–Present

Radio

Play-by-play
Bob Wolff: 1970–1980
Tim Ryan: 1971–1972
Spencer Ross: 1973-2007
John Sterling: 1973–1974
Jim Gordon: 1973–1984
Sal Messina: 1975–1982
Barry Landers: 1976–1977, 1999–2000
Sam Rosen: 1977–1989
Al Albert: 1982–1983
Mike Emrick: 1983–1988
John Kelly: 1988–1989
Howie Rose: 1985–1995
Kenny Albert: 1995–1997
Al Trautwig: 1995–1997
Gary Cohen: 1995–1997
Chris Moore: 1995–1996
Joe Beninati: 1996–1997
Steve Albert: 1996–1997
Bob Wischusen: 2000–2007
Joe Tolleson: 2002–present
Mike Crispino: 2005–2007
John Giannone: 2006–2008
Don La Greca: 2008–present

Color commentator
Pete Stemkowski: 2005–Present

Studio host
Steve Somers: 1990s

References

New York Rangers
broadcasters
 
USA Network Sports
Prime Sports
Madison Square Garden Sports